American a cappella group Pentatonix has released 11 studio albums, five compilation albums, six extended plays (EPs), 34 singles and fifty eight music videos. The group won the third season of The Sing-Off in 2011, and subsequently received a recording contract with Sony. In June 2012, Pentatonix released their first extended play, PTX, Volume 1 through Sony-owned independent record label Madison Gate Records. The EP debuted at number 14 on the US Billboard 200, selling 18,401 copies in its first week of sales. A Christmas EP, PTXmas, was released in November 2012. It was re-released in November 2013 with one of its new tracks, "Little Drummer Boy", debuting at number 13 on the US Billboard Hot 100 and charting in other countries such as Austria, Canada and New Zealand. The EP became the sixth highest-selling Christmas album of 2013, selling over 168,000 copies. In November 2013, Pentatonix released their third EP, PTX, Vol. II which debuted at number 10 on the Billboard 200, selling 31,000 copies in its first week of sales.

In May 2014, Pentatonix signed with RCA Records, a "flagship" label of Sony, releasing their debut studio album, PTX, Vols. 1 & 2 in July 2014. It contained all of the songs from their two namesake EPs and four additional tracks, previously released as singles. A fourth EP, PTX, Vol. III, was released in September 2014.

The group's second full-length Christmas album, That's Christmas to Me was released on October 21, 2014 and peaked at number 2 on the Billboard 200. A single from the album, the group's cover of "Mary, Did You Know?", both debuted and peaked on the Billboard Hot 100 at number 26. In December 2014, That's Christmas to Me was certified gold by the Recording Industry Association of America and became the group's first accredited release in the US, having sold 1,620,000 in the US as of December 2015.  Pentatonix became the first act to top both the "Holiday Albums" and "Holiday Songs" charts simultaneously since the Holiday 100 launched as a multi-metric tabulation in December 2011. The album is also the highest charting holiday album by a group since 1962. In 2016, Pentatonix released another Christmas album, A Pentatonix Christmas and it marked as Pentatonix's second number 1 album on the Billboard 200.

As of July 2017, Pentatonix has sold 4.9 million albums in total in the United States.

Albums

Studio albums

Compilation albums

Extended plays

Singles

Other charted songs

Music videos

Notes

References

Discographies of American artists
Discography